This single contains the opening and ending themes for the anime series Onegai Twins. Second Flight by Kotoko and Hiromi Satō is the opening theme while Asu e no Namida by Mami Kawada is the ending theme.

Track listing 
Second Flight (Kotoko & Hiromi Satō) -- 5:42
Lyrics: Kotoko
Composition: Kazuya Takase
Arrangement: Tomoyuki Nakazawa
Asu e no Namida (Mami Kawada) -- 6:28
Lyrics: Kotoko
Composition/Arrangement: Tomoyuki Nakazawa
Second Flight (Off Vocal) -- 5:42
Asu e no Namida (Off Vocal) -- 6:25

References 

2003 singles
2003 songs
Anime songs
Anime soundtracks
Song recordings produced by I've Sound